is a U.S.-based Japanese professional golfer.

Imada was born in Mihara, Hiroshima, Japan. He came to the United States when he was 14 to attend a Tampa golf academy for Asian players. His instructor was (and still is) Richard Abele, who became his legal guardian. Under Abele's teaching, he won several of the top tournaments on the amateur circuit and reached the final of the 1997 U.S. Amateur Public Links. His accomplishments in the American Junior Golf Association led to a scholarship to University of Georgia, where he played for two years and helped the Bulldogs win the 1999 NCAA title.

Imada turned professional in 1999. From 2000 to 2004 he played on the second tier Nationwide Tour, winning the 2000 Buy.com Virginia Beach Open and the 2004 BMW Charity Pro-Am at The Cliffs. On the Monday following his win, Imada fired a back-nine score of 29 in U.S. Open qualifying at Scotch Valley, in Hollidaysburg, Pennsylvania. He was the medalist, with a score of 64, and advanced to sectional qualifying. His third-place finish on the 2004 money list earned him promotion to the PGA Tour.

In Imada's first season at the elite level, he had a best placing of fifth and earned enough money to retain his tour card for 2006. In the 2006 U.S. Open, he fired closing rounds of 69-71 to finish in a tie for 12th. His 69 in round three was one of only six under par rounds during a brutal weekend at Winged Foot.

In 2007, Imada had his best finish on the PGA Tour, finishing in 2nd place at the AT&T Classic, winning $583,200. In 2008, Imada again finished in 2nd place at the Buick Invitational, moving him into the top 100 of the Official World Golf Rankings. In May 2008 he won his first PGA Tour tournament at the AT&T Classic, beating Kenny Perry in a playoff, and reached the top 50 of the world rankings for the first time.

Imada was unable to follow up his win and split his time among the PGA Tour, Web.com Tour, and Japan Golf Tour.

Amateur wins
this list may be incomplete
1995 Porter Cup
1996 Azalea Invitational

Professional wins (3)

PGA Tour wins (1)

PGA Tour playoff record (1–1)

Nationwide Tour wins (2)

Nationwide Tour playoff record (1–0)

Results in major championships

CUT = missed the half-way cut
"T" = tied

Results in The Players Championship

CUT = missed the halfway cut
"T" indicates a tie for a place

Results in World Golf Championships

"T" = Tied
Note that the HSBC Champions did not become a WGC event until 2009.

Team appearances
World Cup (representing Japan): 2008, 2009

See also
2004 Nationwide Tour graduates

References

External links

Japanese male golfers
Georgia Bulldogs men's golfers
PGA Tour golfers
Korn Ferry Tour graduates
Sportspeople from Hiroshima Prefecture
1976 births
Living people